Kirsten Danielle Tan Delavin (born May 1, 1999), popularly known as Kisses Delavin, is a Filipino actress, beauty queen, and recording artist. She first gained fame in 2016 as a contestant in the reality television series, Pinoy Big Brother: Lucky 7, where she placed second.

Early life and education
Kisses Delavin was born as Kirsten Danielle Tan Delavin on May 1, 1999 in Masbate, Philippines. She had a younger sister named Keithleen Gracerie "Candy" Delavin, who was born prematurely on her mother's sixth month of pregnancy however she died at age 1. At age 6, Delavin was diagnosed with viral encephalitis and was comatose for less than a day. Her mother describes her as a "miracle baby" as out of the eight pregnancies that she had, only Delavin survived.

At a young age, Delavin showed interest in beauty contests, joining her first one at the age of 3. She entered several beauty contests, winning Miss Teen Masbate in 2013, and Miss Masbate and Miss Kaogma in 2016.

Delavin attended De La Salle University (DLSU) to pursue a bachelor's degree in accountancy then placed it on hold when she joined Pinoy Big Brother. In 2019, she returned to DLSU, where she studied towards a bachelor of science degree in business administration.

Career

Delavin first started her career as a print-ad model for Natasha, a direct selling company carrying shoes, apparel, and accessories in the Philippines. She then subsequently had a short appearance in the drama series Pangako Sa 'Yo (2015).

In 2016, Delavin auditioned for the thirteenth season of the reality television series Pinoy Big Brother after she saw an advertisement on Facebook and was later on chosen and officially introduced as one of the teen housemates. On the late-night talk show Tonight with Boy Abunda, when asked by Abunda the reason she joined, Delavin said "to prove that she is ready to become an independent woman". She was later announced as a semi-finalist on the show and had to temporarily exit due to the program's format. During the show's finale, Delavin was announced as a runner-up, with her closest friend in the PBB house, Maymay Entrata winning the competition.

Delavin has appeared on episodes of Minute to Win It, Family Feud, Gandang Gabi, Vice!, Tonight with Boy Abunda, It's Showtime, ASAP, Magandang Buhay, Umagang Kay Ganda, Banana Sundae, Rated K, and Matanglawin.

Together with her co-PBB housemate Marco Gallo, she was the MYX Celebrity VJ for the month of July 2017. Collectively known as KissMarc, they also starred in Young JV's music video for the song "Kulay". They appeared together on several online and print materials, public engagements, and ABS-CBN TV shows and movies. Despite the success, the team-up ended following a controversial interview in the online show, Kapamilya Chat.
In October 2017, Delavin signed a contract under Star Music. She was the first official artist under the music sub-label, Star Pop. Tickets to her 
self-titled grand album launch in November 2017 sold out within 30 minutes. More than 15,000 units of her album were sold the day prior to its launch. She formally received her Gold and Platinum Awards from Philippine Association of the Record Industry (PARI) on the January 21, 2018 episode of ASAP.

In February 2018, Delavin's first solo sold-out concert entitled Confidently Kisses was held at KIA Theatre, with guests Sam Milby, Karla Estrada, Marlo Mortel, and Tony Labrusca.

In 2018, Delavin became one of the regular hosts of ASAP Chillout.

She also appeared twice on the front cover of MEGA Magazine. The March issue pictorial was set in Prague, Czech Republic.

She was teamed up with MYX VJ Donny Pangilinan (dubbed as DonKiss by their fans) for the movies Walwal and Fantastica. They later on starred in the hit romantic comedy daytime television series, Playhouse.

For five consecutive years (2017-2021), Delavin was among Twitter's Top 10 Most Tweeted about Accounts in the Philippines. She has also been named The Most Beautiful Woman in the Philippines by Starmometer in 2020.

In April 2019, Delavin had her 2nd solo sold-out concert entitled A Life Full Of Kisses at Music Museum.

In November 2019, Delavin left Star Magic and signed with APT Entertainment and Triple A Management, which manages Kapuso actresses Maine Mendoza and Marian Rivera. She is currently a freelance artist and started appearing on some of the TV programs of GMA Network.

Delavin has appeared on an episode of Mars Pa More, The Boobay and Tekla Show, Tonight with Arnold Clavio, All-Out Sundays, Eat Bulaga, Unang Hirit and Wowowin on GMA Network.

In December 2020, Delavin stated that she would take a break from the entertainment industry by moving back to Masbate to focus on her studies, which caused her projects and lock-in tapings to be placed on hiatus until further notice, due to her parents not allowing her amidst the COVID-19 pandemic in the Philippines.

In May 2021, during an interview with Ricky Lo, Delavin has confirmed that she would return to Manila from Masbate once the COVID-19 vaccines are fully rolled out.

Representing Masbate, Delavin finished as a Top 10 finalist at Miss Universe Philippines 2021 on September 30, 2021 in Bohol. Beatrice Gomez of Cebu City won the said pageant.

Filmography

Movies

Television

Digital

Commercials

Discography

Albums

Singles

Concert

Awards and nominations

References

External links 

1999 births
Living people
Filipino artists
Filipino child actresses
Filipino film actresses
Filipino television actresses
Pinoy Big Brother contestants
ABS-CBN personalities
GMA Network personalities
Star Magic
Miss Universe Philippines contestants
21st-century Filipino artists
21st-century Filipino actresses
21st-century Filipino women singers
Star Music artists